Union of Communists of Armenia was a communist party in Armenia.

History
Prior to the 2003 Armenian parliamentary election, the party formed part of the Free and Fair Armenia electoral bloc together with the Marxist Party of Armenia. However, the bloc was denied registration on the ground that neither of the two parties had submitted proper registration.

On 7 July the same year, the Union of Communists of Armenia dissolved as party members merged with the United Communist Party of Armenia.

See also

 List of political parties in Armenia
 Politics of Armenia
 Programs of political parties in Armenia

References

Communist parties in Armenia
Defunct political parties in Armenia